Emblemaria pandionis, the sailfin blenny, is a species of marine fish from the family Chaenopsidae. It occurs in the Caribbean Sea. It occasionally makes its way into the aquarium trade. It grows to a maximum length of  SL.

References

External links
 

pandionis
Fish of the Caribbean
Fish described in 1900